James Temple Fisher (1828 – 3 January 1905) was a 19th-century Member of Parliament from Canterbury, New Zealand.

Fisher arrived in New Zealand on the Charlotte Jane, one of the First Four Ships.

He represented the Heathcote electorate from 1876 to 1881, when he was defeated.

He was Postmaster-General and Commissioner of Telegraphs in the Grey Ministry, from 15 October 1877 to 8 October 1879.

He died on 3 January 1905 at his home in south Colombo Street in the Heathcote district. He is buried at Barbadoes Street Cemetery.

References

|-

1828 births
1905 deaths
Members of the New Zealand House of Representatives
People from Christchurch
Canterbury Pilgrims
Burials at Barbadoes Street Cemetery
Unsuccessful candidates in the 1881 New Zealand general election
Unsuccessful candidates in the 1884 New Zealand general election
New Zealand MPs for Christchurch electorates
Members of the Cabinet of New Zealand
19th-century New Zealand politicians
Date of birth missing